Miloš Gibala (born 21 May 1985) is a Slovak football forward who played in the Czech First League for Ústí nad Labem.

External links

References

1985 births
Living people
Slovak footballers
Association football forwards
MŠK Novohrad Lučenec players
FK Dukla Banská Bystrica players
MŠK Rimavská Sobota players
FC ViOn Zlaté Moravce players
ŠK Futura Humenné players
Slovak Super Liga players
Czech First League players
FK Ústí nad Labem players
Expatriate footballers in the Czech Republic